The Sym Jet Euro X is both  a scooter-style moped and scooter available with  and  two-stroke engines respectively. The underseat storage compartment can take a full-size helmet. Both engines are air-cooled.

External links
 Official Website

Motor scooters
Mopeds
Two-stroke motorcycles
Motorcycles of Taiwan